The team dressage at the 1928 Summer Olympics took place at Hilversum. Scores from the individual competition were summed to give results in the team competition.  1928 marked the first appearance of the team dressage competition, making it the last of the modern six-event Olympic equestrian programme to appear.

Results
Source: Official results; De Wael

References

Equestrian at the 1928 Summer Olympics